The year 2023 will be the ninth year in the history of the Rizin Fighting Federation, a mixed martial arts promotion based in Japan. It started broadcasting through a television agreement with Fuji Television. Both in Europe and North America Rizin FF is accessible on live-now and PPV worldwide.

List of events

Rizin 41 – Osaka

Rizin 41 – Osaka will be a Combat sport event held by Rizin Fighting Federation on April 1, 2023, at the Maruzen Intec Arena in Osaka, Japan.

Background
A bantamweight kickboxing bout between Ryusei Ashizawa and the one-time K-1 super featherweight title challenger Kouzi headlined the event.

Fight card

Rizin Landmark 5

Rizin Landmark 5 will be a Combat sport event held by Rizin Fighting Federation on April 29, 2023, at the Yoyogi National Gymnasium in Tokyo, Japan.

Background
A featherweight bout between the former Rizin featherweight champion Juntaro Ushiku and Mikuru Asakura served as the event headliner, while a featherweight bout between another former Rizin featherweight champion Yutaka Saito and Ren Hiramoto was booked as the co-main event.

Fight card

Rizin 42

Rizin 42 will be a Combat sport event held by Rizin Fighting Federation on May 6, 2023, at the Ariake Arena in Tokyo, Japan.

Background
A bantamweight bout between Yuki Motoya and the former Rizin Bantamweight champion Kai Asakura was booked as the event headliner.

Fight card

See also
List of current Rizin FF fighters
 2023 in UFC
 2023 in Bellator MMA
 2023 in ONE Championship
 2023 in Absolute Championship Akhmat
 2023 in Konfrontacja Sztuk Walki
 2023 in AMC Fight Nights
 2023 in Brave Combat Federation
 2023 in Road FC
 2023 Professional Fighters League season
 2023 in Eagle Fighting Championship
 2023 in Legacy Fighting Alliance

References

External links
 Official event
 

Rizin Fighting Federation
Rizin
2023 in Japanese sport
2023 sport-related lists